Valeriy Victorovich Igoshev (born March 4, 1956, Moscow, Russia; Russian: Игошев, Валерий Викторович) is a Russian scientist. He is the lead researcher of the Department of Manuscripts of the State Research Institute of the Art Restorations in Moscow. His expertise is in the attribution of ancient liturgical books and Russian metal art from the 14th to 20th centuries.

Igoshev works in the field of restoration and reconstruction of historical objects, icons, church utensils, and temple decorations and is a metal art restorer.

Biography
In 1990, Valeriy Igoshev graduated from one of the oldest Russian schools for industrial, monumental, and decorative art and design, the Stroganov Moscow State University of Arts and Industry as a specialist in Metal Art. He earned a PhD in 1994 from MVHPU S.G. Stroganov, specialty: state code 17.00.05 - arts, crafts, and architecture and became Doctor of Science (D.Sc.) in 2008: MGHPU S.G. Stroganov (specialty: state code 17.00.04 - fine, decorative and applied arts and architecture). Since 1978, he has been a researcher at the State Research Institute of Art Restorations.

Igoshev has taught and participated in the creation of training programs for art restorers in a number of educational institutions:

 Suzdal Art Restorations School (1982);
 Moscow State Art and Industry University S.G. Stroganov (2002–2008),
 Russian Academy of Painting, Sculpture and the Architecture (2003–2006).
 Courses on the art of jewellery in the Research University School of Economics (2010–2014).

Scientific activity
Valeriy Igoshev's research areas are the restoration and reconstruction of ancient art, historical objects, icons, church utensils, and temple decorations. He has participated in various research projects and scientific expeditions:

 "Metal Art of the 16th and 17th centuries. Novgorod the Great "(1998–2008);
 "Russian Icons on Sinai" (2004–2011);
"Antiquities of the Old Believers" (2004–2005);
"Russian church utensils and works of art in Greece" (2010–2012);
 "Icons of the Russian Modern" (2014–2015).

Igoshev has written over 200 articles about precious collections; participant in the collective monographs and catalogues.

References

1956 births
Living people
Scientists from Moscow
Conservator-restorers
Stroganov Moscow State Academy of Arts and Industry alumni